Carinastele jugosa is a species of sea snail, a marine gastropod mollusk in the family Calliostomatidae.

Description

Distribution
This marine species occurs off New Zealand at a depth of about 550 m.

References

 Marshall B.A. (1988) Thysanodontinae: A new subfamily of the Trochidae (Gastropoda). Journal of Molluscan Studies 54: 215–229. page(s): 222

External links

jugosa
Gastropods described in 1988